The 1977–78 Segunda División was the 29th season of the Mexican Segunda División. The season started on 8 July 1977 and concluded on 7 May 1978. It was won by Zacatepec.

Starting this season, 3 points were awarded for victory with more than two goals difference.

Changes 
 Atlante was promoted to Primera División.
 Zacatepec was relegated from Primera División.
 Estado de México was promoted from Tercera División.
 Celaya was relegated from Segunda División.
 Córdoba was renamed as Universidad Veracruzana de Córdoba.
 Ciudad Sahagún was bought by new owners, the club was moved to Acapulco and renamed as Inter Acapulco.

During the season 
 After Week 4, Tampico was promoted to the Primera Division after purchasing the San Luis franchise. The place of Tampico was purchased by Bachilleres.
 After Week 15, the UAEM franchise was bought by new owners, the club was relocated at Ciudad Nezahualcóyotl and renamed as Coyotes Neza.

Teams

Group stage

Group 1

Group 2

Group 3

Group 4

Results

Final stage

Group 1

Group 2

Final

References 

1977–78 in Mexican football
Segunda División de México seasons